Mannancherry is a village in Alappuzha district in Kerala, India. It is situated about 10 km north of Alappuzha town. Vembanad Lake forms the eastern boundary of the village. In governance, Mannancherry is a Panchayat. In parliamentary representation, it is part of the Alappuzha Assembly constituency, as well as the Alappuzha LokSabha constituency. The primary occupation of the village's inhabitants has been coir-making for the past several decades.

Location
Mannanchery is well connected by road. NH 47 passes through Kalavoor, which is 2 km to the west of Mannanchery. Nearest major railway station is Alappuzha and airport is Cochin International Airport.

Notable institutions

Education 
 Government High School, Mannancherry
 Government Higher Secondary School, Kalavoor
 Gayathri English Medium School, Mannancherry
 Crescent Public School, Mannancherry
 Darul Huda Orphanage & English Medium School, Mannancherry
 There are other schools located at Ponnad, Kavungal, Tharamood Aryad, Thambakachuvadu

Health Care 
 Government Ayurvedic Centre, Kavunkal
 PalmShade Multispeciality Hospital and ClearSky Diagnostics, Ambalakadavu
 We One Hospital, Kavunkal
 Golden Flower Medical Centre, Adivaram
 Diacare Laboratory, Mannancherry

Finance 
 Federal Bank, Mannnanchery
 State Bank of India ATM & CDM, Mannancherry

Worship 
 Thrikkovil Mahadevar Temple, Mannancherry
 Manakkal Sree Devi Kshethram, Kunnappalli
 Sree Poonjilikavil Devi Kshethram, Kavunkal
 Madathumkara Mahadeva Temple
 St.Mary's Church, Mannancherry
 Thafreejiyya Sunni Musjid, Mannancherry
 West Mahallu Muslim Jama'ath
 East Mahallu Muslim Jama'ath
 Salafi Juma Masjid
 Chiyamveli Irshadhul Islam Juma Masjid
 Islamic Centre Mannancherry (Samastha Zone Office)
 Naluthara Ahmmed Moulavi Memorial Islamic Centre
 Kuppezham Muhiyudheen Juma Masjid
 Sheikh Fareed Ouliya Masjid, Changampodu
 Town Juma Masjid Mannancherry

Demographics
 India census, Mannanchery had a population of 28,338 with 13,796 males and 14,542 females.

References

Villages in Alappuzha district